Guru Ravidas Ayurved University is a public university for Ayurveda, Yoga & Naturopathy, Unani, Siddha and Homeopathy (abbreviated as AYUSH) located in Hoshiarpur, Punjab, India.

List of Top 5 Homeopathic Medical Colleges For B.H.M.S. 

 National Institute of Homeopathy
 Homeopathic Medical College, Abohar
 BHopal Homeopathic Medical College
 Nehru Homeopathic Medical College
 Father Muller Institute of Homeopathy

Courses
 Doctor of Medicine (in Homeopathy)
 Doctor of Medicine (in Ayurveda)
 Bachelor of Ayurveda, Medicine and Surgery
 Bachelor in Homeopathic Medicine & Surgery
 Bachelor in Unani Medicine

Affiliated colleges

Ayurvedic colleges
 Govt. Ayurvedic College, Lower Mall, Patiala
 Shri Lakshmi Narayan Ayurvedic College, O/S Lohgarh Gate, Amritsar
 Dayanand Ayurvedic College, Jalandhar
 Sri Satya Sai Murlidhar Ayurvedic College, Moga
 Mai Bhago Ayurvedic College (for Women), Shri Mukatsar Sahib
 Guru Nanak Ayurvedic Medical College, Shri Mukatsar Sahib
 Guru Nanak Ayurvedic Medical College & Research Institute, Gopalpur (Ludhiana)
 Shaheed Kartar Singh Sarabha Ayurvedic Medical College & Hospital, Sarabha
 Babe Ke Ayurvedic Medical College & Hospital, Dodhar (Moga)
 Smt Urmila Devi Ayurvedic College of Medical Sciences & Hospital, Hoshiarpur
 Saint Sahara Ayurvedic Medical College & Hospital, Kot Shameer (Bathinda)
 Shri Dhanwantry Ayurvedic College& Dabur Dhanwantry Hospital, Sector 46-B, Chandigarh
 Shiv Shakti Ayurvedic College & Hospital, Sunam Road, Bhikhi (Mansa)
 Harmony Ayurvedic College, Ferozpur
 Sarswati Ayurvedic Medical College, Gharuan (Kharar)
 Baba Hira Das Ji Ayurvedic Medical College & Hospital, V.P.O. Badal
 Khalsa Ayurvedic Medical College And Hospital, Nangal Kalan,(Mansa)

Homeopathic colleges
 Homeopathic Medical College, Abohar
 Sri Guru Nanak Dev Homeopathic Medical College, Ludhiana
 Lord Mahavira Homeopathic Medical College, Ludhiana
 Kalyan Homeopathic Medical College & Hospital, Taran Taran

Unani Colleges
 Rehbar Ayurvedic & Unani Tibbi Medical College, Hospital and Research Centre, Bhawanigarh (Sangrur)

References

External links

Universities in Punjab, India
Hoshiarpur district
Educational institutions established in 2011
2011 establishments in Punjab, India